The following are the association football events of the year 1980 throughout the world.

Events 
Copa Libertadores 1980: Won by Nacional after defeating Sport Club Internacional on an aggregate score of 2–0.
England: 1980 FA Cup Final: West Ham United 1, Arsenal 0, the winning goal scored by Trevor Brooking
European Cup 1980: Won by Nottingham Forest after defeating Hamburger SV 1–0 in the Final.
Scottish Cup final: Celtic beat Rangers 1-0 after extra time at Hampden Park. After the match there is a pitch invasion, leading to rioting and 210 arrests. Following the match the sale of alcohol at Scottish football grounds is banned.
September 10 – Midfielder Jan van Deinsen plays his first and only international match for the Netherlands, when the Netherlands meets the Republic of Ireland in Dublin.
September 17 – Dutch side FC Utrecht makes its European debut with a draw (0-0) in Romania against FC Argeș Pitești in the first round of the UEFA Cup.

Winners club national championship

Asia
: Al-Sadd SC

Europe
: Club Brugge K.V.
: Liverpool
: FC Nantes
: Inter Milan

 Eredivisie – Ajax Amsterdam
 Eerste Divisie – FC Groningen
: Sporting CP
 Spain: Real Madrid
: Spartak Moscow
: Trabzonspor
: Bayern Munich
: Red Star Belgrade

North America
: Cruz Azul
 / :
 New York Cosmos (NASL)

Oceania
: Sydney City

South America

Metropolitano – River Plate
Nacional – Rosario Central
: Flamengo
: Jorge Wilstermann
: Atlético Junior
 Paraguay: Olimpia Asunción

International Tournaments
 African Cup of Nations in Nigeria (March 8 – 22 1980)
 
 
 
1980 British Home Championship (May 16 – May 24, 1980)

 UEFA European Football Championship in Italy (June 11 – 22 1980)
 
 
  and 
Olympic Games in Moscow, Soviet Union (July 20 – August 2, 1980)
 
 
 
 Mundialito in Montevideo, Uruguay (December 30, 1980 – January 10, 1981)
 
 
 —

National Teams



Births 

 January 6 – Steed Malbranque, Belgian-French footballer
 January 14 – Ossama Haidar, Lebanese international 
 January 25 – Xavi, Spanish footballer
 February 1
Moisés Muñoz, Mexican footballer
Otilino Tenorio, Ecuadorian footballer (d. 2005)
 February 9 – Jean-Reck Ah Fok, Mauritian footballer
 February 15 – Elvis Marecos, Paraguayan footballer
 February 20 – Artur Boruc, Polish footballer
 February 20 – Thijs Sluijter, Dutch footballer
 February 28 – Piotr Giza, Polish footballer
 March 4 – Omar Bravo, Mexican footballer
 March 14 – Aaron Brown, English footballer
 March 15 – Hugo Notario, Argentine footballer
 March 21 – Ronaldinho, Brazilian footballer
 March 21 – John McGrath, Irish footballer
 March 31
Matias Concha, Swedish footballer
Dean Clark, English footballer
 April 22 – Nicolas Douchez, French footballer
 May 14 – Zdeněk Grygera, Czech footballer
 May 18 – Diego Pérez, Uruguayan footballer
 May 30 – Steven Gerrard, English footballer
 June 2 – Abby Wambach, American footballer
 June 10 – Francelino Matuzalem, Brazilian footballer
 June 12 – Ifet Taljević, Yugoslav-born German club footballer
 June 26 – Michael Jackson, English club footballer
 June 30
 Rade Prica, Swedish international
 Sayuti, Indonesian club footballer
 July 8 – Robbie Keane, Irish footballer
 August 5 – Wayne Bridge, English footballer
 August 6
Danny Collins, English-Welsh footballer
Roman Weidenfeller, German footballer
 August 7 – Shane Moody-Orio, Belizean footballer
 August 12 – Javier Chevantón, Uruguayan footballer
 September 6 – Joseph Yobo, Nigerian footballer
 September 9 – Steeve Theophile, French footballer
 September 17 – Mikhail Nekrasov, former Russian professional footballer
 September 18 – Marco Antonio Mendoza, Mexican footballer
 September 29 – Patrick Agyemang, Ghanaian international
 October 4 – Tomáš Rosický, Czech international
 October 9
 Kert Kütt, Estonian  footballer 
 Amir Nussbaum, Israeli footballer
 Ibrahim Fazeel, Maldivian footballer
 Fábio Pinto, Brazilian footballer
 Warren Waugh, English footballer
 October 23 – Scott Parker, English international
 October 27 – Radhakrishnan Dhanarajan, Indian club footballer (d. 2019)
 October 28 – Alan Smith, English international
 November 2 – Diego Lugano, Uruguayan footballer
 November 5 – Christoph Metzelder, German international
 November 18 – Luke Chadwick, English youth international
 November 22 – David Artell, English club footballer and manager
 November 26 – Sergei Viktorovich Kudryavtsev, former Russian professional footballer
 December 6 – Steve Lovell, English club footballer
 December 7 – John Terry, English footballer
 December 20 – Ashley Cole, English footballer
 December 31 – Beto Gonçalves, Brazilian-born Indonesian international

 Date unknown
 Mohammad Fazel Bratyan, Afghan football player

Deaths

February
 February 22 – Pierre Korb, French international footballer (born 1908)

March
 March 1 – Dixie Dean, English international footballer (born 1907)

June
 June 8 – Alfredo Brilhante da Costa, Brazilian international defender, Brazilian squad member at the 1930 FIFA World Cup. (75)
 June 9 – Miguel Capuccini, Uruguayan goalkeeper, winner of the 1930 FIFA World Cup. (76)

September
 September 9 – José de Anchieta Fontana, Brazilian international defender, winner of the 1970 FIFA World Cup. (39)

References

External links
  Rec.Sport.Soccer Statistics Foundation
  VoetbalStats

 
Association football by year